Swinging Out Live (1991) is a live performance VHS with Harry Connick Jr. and his orchestra. The concert was filmed in 1990 at the Majestic Theatre in Dallas, as part of his national tour. It was aired as part of PBS' Great Performances.

Track listing
"Hudson Bomber" (Harry Connick Jr.)    
"Anguilla"     
"Don't Get Around Much Anymore" (Duke Ellington, Bob Russell)    
"I Could Write a Book" (Lorenz Hart, Richard Rodgers)    
"All I Need Is the Girl" (Stephen Sondheim, Jule Styne)    
"Avalon" (Buddy De Sylva, Al Jolson, Vincent Rose)    
"Something's Gotta Give" (Johnny Mercer)     
"Forever, For Now" (Connick, Ramsey McLean)    
"Recipe for Love" (Connick)    
"How Deep Is the Ocean?" (Irving Berlin)    
"We Are in Love" (Connick)    
"It Had to Be You" (Isham Jones, Gus Kahn)    
"It's All Right With Me" (Cole Porter)    
"When the Saints Go Marching In" (traditional)    
"Do You Know What It Means to Miss New Orleans?" (Louis Alter, Eddie DeLange)

Certifications
RIAA certification: Video longform – Platinum (March 26, 1991)

References

Harry Connick Jr. video albums
1991 video albums